CKIN may refer to:

 CKIN-FM 106.3, a radio station in Montreal, Quebec, Canada
Chesapeake and Indiana Railroad reporting mark

See also
Protein kinase C, commonly abbreviated to PKC, also C-kinase, a family of protein kinase enzymes that are involved in controlling the function of other proteins